Paganino Doria was an Italian admiral from the prominent Genoese Doria family. He was the victorious head of the Genoese naval forces in the conflict between the Republic of Genoa to Venice in the middle of the 14th century.

Paganino Doria seized Tenedos (now Bozcaada) in 1350.

He set siege to Chalcis in Euboea in 1351.

In 1352 he commanded the Genoese Navy in a fight against Niccolò Pisani, Admiral of the Venetians, off the coasts of Constantinople: the victory was granted to the Genoese but it cost them so much that Doria lost the command.

The next year Venetians allied with Catalans defeated Genoa’s fleet led by Antonio Grimaldi off the coast of Sardinia. Genoa had 2,000 men killed and 3,500 taken prisoner. Doria was called back in 1354: he ravaged the coast of the Adriatic (Poreč) and completely captured the Venetian fleet under Pisani at the Battle of Sapienza or battle of Porto-Longo, between the fortresses of Modon (mod. Methoni) and Navarino or Zonklon (Pylos) in southern Greece.

This brilliant success ended the war. Marino Faliero, Doge of Venice, accepted the terms of peace imposed by Genoa and agreed to pay an indemnity of 200,000 florins.

References

See also
Venetian–Genoese Wars

14th-century Genoese people
Paganino
Genoese admirals
Year of birth missing
Year of death missing
People of the Venetian–Genoese wars